White Pigeon is a village in St. Joseph County in the U.S. state of Michigan. The population was 1,522 at the 2010 census. The village is located within White Pigeon Township.

Geography
The White Pigeon River flows through the south end of town, emptying into the St. Joseph River that flows to Lake Michigan.

Major highways

History

White Pigeon was incorporated by European Americans in 1837.  The United States Land Office, located in downtown White Pigeon, is the oldest surviving U.S. Land office in the state of Michigan. Following the cession of Native American lands in this area by leaders of regional tribes, the U.S. government sold more than 250,000 acres of land in Michigan for $1.25 an acre in the 1830s to settlers of Western Michigan.

The town was named after the local Potawatomi chief Wahbememe, which means White Pigeon. He was buried in the town, with a memorial stone marking his grave. This gravesite is now listed on the National Register of Historic Places.

According to legend, while he was at the gathering of the chiefs in Detroit, Wahbememe heard plans to attack the settlement which is now White Pigeon. The chief was a friend to the white settlers and did not want to see harm come to them, so he set out on foot and ran almost 150 miles to the settlement to warn the people. After running that long distance and giving his warning, he collapsed and soon died from exhaustion.

Demographics

2010 census
As of the census of 2010, there were 1,522 people, 621 households, and 383 families residing in the village. The racial makeup of the village was 93.3% White, 0.3% African American, 0.9% Native American, 0.5% Asian, 2.6% from other races, and 2.4% from two or more races. Hispanic or Latino of any race were 5.2% of the population.

There were 621 households, of which 34.5% had children under the age of 18 living with them, 40.4% were married couples living together, 14.0% had a female householder with no husband present, 7.2% had a male householder with no wife present, and 38.3% were non-families. 29.3% of all households were made up of individuals, and 12.2% had someone living alone who was 65 years of age or older. The average household size was 2.45 and the average family size was 3.02.

The median age in the village was 37.1 years. 27.1% of residents were under the age of 18; 7.3% were between the ages of 18 and 24; 24.9% were from 25 to 44; 25.5% were from 45 to 64; and 15.2% were 65 years of age or older. The gender makeup of the village was 47.0% male and 53.0% female.

2000 census
As of the census of 2000, there were 1,627 people, 602 households, and 431 families residing in the village. The racial makeup of the village was 94.59% White, 0.18% African American, 1.11% Native American, 0.55% Asian, 0.06% Pacific Islander, 2.03% from other races, and 1.48% from two or more races. Hispanic or Latino of any race were 2.58% of the population.

There were 602 households, out of which 35.4% had children under the age of 18 living with them, 51.2% were married couples living together, 15.4% had a female householder with no husband present, and 28.4% were non-families. 21.8% of all households were made up of individuals, and 6.8% had someone living alone who was 65 years of age or older.  The average household size was 2.70 and the average family size was 3.13.

In the village, the population was spread out, with 29.1% under the age of 18, 9.6% from 18 to 24, 29.6% from 25 to 44, 21.5% from 45 to 64, and 10.2% who were 65 years of age or older.  The median age was 33 years. For every 100 females there were 85.3 males.  For every 100 females age 18 and over, there were 85.2 males.

The median income for a household in the village was $41,292, and the median income for a family was $43,182. Males had a median income of $32,470 versus $21,327 for females. The per capita income for the village was $16,895.  About 10.5% of families and 13.1% of the population were below the poverty line, including 20.1% of those under age 18 and 1.8% of those age 65 or over.

Transportation

White Pigeon is served by the Michigan Southern Railroad (which has its main yard complex in town) and the Grand Elk Railroad to the west of town.

Notable people
 John S. Barry, fourth Governor of Michigan, lived in White Pigeon.
 Orris Pratt, farmer and member of the Wisconsin State Assembly, was born in White Pigeon.
 Scott Bales (born 1956), former Chief Justice of the Arizona Supreme Court grew up in White Pigeon.
 Samuel Pratt, farmer and member of the Wisconsin State Assembly and the Wisconsin State Senate, lived for a time in White Pigeon, where his son Orris Pratt (above) was born.
 Laney Byler, farmer and member of the Michigan Daily, was born and raised in White Pigeon where she was inducted into the White Pigeon Hall of Fame in 2019.

See also

 List of villages in Michigan

References

External links

Villages in St. Joseph County, Michigan
1837 establishments in Michigan
Michigan placenames of Native American origin